Makulussa Colony is a village in Sri Lanka. It is located within Central Province (Sinhalese: මධ්‍යම පළාත Madhyama Palata, Tamil: மத்திய மாகாணம் Madhiya Maakaanam).

See also
List of towns in Central Province, Sri Lanka

External links

Populated places in Matale District